The Kurdistan Region parliamentary elections of 2009 took place on 25 July 2009. A total of 2.5 million citizens of Kurdistan Region were eligible to vote for the parliamentary and presidential elections. People currently living outside Kurdistan Region were not allowed to vote. The elections followed the 2005 Kurdistan Region parliamentary election. The parliamentary elections coincided with the direct election of the President of Kurdistan. Unlike the parliamentary elections in 2005, the president of Kurdistan was to be chosen directly through popular votes. A referendum to approve the constitution of Kurdistan Region originally planned for the same day was put back to 1 August.

Campaigning for the elections officially started on 22 June 2009 and was to be stopped 48 hours before voting started. The elections were held with 84 registration centers and 5,403 polling stations in Kurdistan Region and 5 polling stations in Baghdad.

Supervision 

The elections for the Kurdistan National Assembly were administered by the Independent High Electoral Commission. In addition, international observers monitored the elections, including from the European Commission.

The elections were originally scheduled to take place on 19 May, but were delayed until 25 July.

Minorities 

Eleven of the 111 seats are reserved for minorities. Five are reserved for Assyrians, five for Turkmen, and one for Armenians. The Assyrian seats will be contested by four lists, the Turkmen seats by four as well and the Armenian seat by three individuals.

Voting system 

The voting system to be used is the closed list system, as was used for the 2005 Kurdistan Region parliamentary election. The open list system had been introduced for the 2009 Iraqi governorate elections elsewhere in Iraq, and the decision to stay with a closed list was criticised by members of the Kurdistan National Assembly who argued open lists strengthened the relationship between voters and candidates and reduced corruption.

At least 30% of the candidates on each list must be female.

Electoral candidates 

There were 509 candidates running in the elections, from 25 parties or lists. Five of these entities were electoral alliances and others were political parties. The two main Kurdish parties - the Kurdistan Democratic Party of Iraq of Kurdistan President Masoud Barzani and the Patriotic Union of Kurdistan of the President of Iraq, Jalal Talabani - continued their electoral coalition in the Kurdistani List. They were challenged by the Change List led by Nawshirwan Mustafa, the former deputy secretary general of the PUK and Jawhar Namiq, a former secretary general of the KDP and speaker of the Kurdistan National Assembly. The Kurdistan Islamic Union and Islamic Group in Kurdistan formed a coalition with two secular parties called the Service and Reform List. 
The full list of entities, each with their lot number, are listed below:

Armenian individuals:
 Aram Shahine Dawood Bakoyan (74)
 Eshkhan Malkon Sargisyan (73)
 Aertex Morses Sargisyan (75)

Campaign 

During the campaign, the electoral commission was reported to have fined the Kurdistani List 3 million riyals for unspecified electoral violations.

A poll of 1,000 people by the Kurdistan-based Point Organization for Opinion Polls & Strategic Studies found most thought the Change List would pose a serious challenge but 49% thought the Kurdistani List would use "threats and fraud".

The Change List has accused the ruling parties of sacking regional government employees who had links to their party. They also claimed that a colonel in the peshmerge regional army had been arrested for supporting them. A Kurdistani List candidate responded by saying "No party allows its members to vote for another list". The Progress List also accused regional intelligence agents of threatening to kill their supporters. Supporters of the change List were shot at in Kifri.

Supporters of the Kurdistani and Change Lists clashed in Sulaimaniyah and were separated by police wielding taser guns.

Worker-communist Party of Kurdistan boycotted the elections because conditions and principles for a fair elections were not met.

Results 

Initial reports gave the Kurdistani List 60 percent of the vote, equating to around 55 seats. The Change List claimed it had won around 28 seats.

According to the Los Angeles Times, "Change mounted a spirited challenge to the monopoly on power of the two main parties, the Kurdistan Democratic Party and the Patriotic Union of Kurdistan, making this the first competitive election the semiautonomous enclave has seen. Turnout was put at 78.5%, an indication of the enthusiasm the contest has generated among Kurds."

The following tables show the results of the parliamentary and presidential votes by party and by presidential candidate. Seats in yellow indicate reserved minority seats.

References

2009 elections in Iraq
2009 in Iraqi Kurdistan
2009
July 2009 events in Iraq